Anna Amelia Churchill Wait (1837–1916) was active in the suffrage movement in Kansas. She is known for establishing an Equal Suffrage Association branch.

Life
Wait née Churchill was born on March 26, 1837 in Medina County, Ohio. In 1857 she married Walter Scott Wait with whom she had one child. The couple moved to Missouri. With outbreak of the Civil War, Walter became part of the Company H, Fiftieth Illinois Volunteer Infantry in the Union Army. During Walter's three years of service Anna and her son lived in Ohio where Anna earned a living as a teacher. After Walter's return the family moved first to Indiana in 1869, and to Kansas in 1871, settling in Lincoln County in 1872. 

Wait was active in the suffrage movement in Kansas. In 1879 Wait, along with Emily J. Briggs and Sarah E. Lutes established the district branch of the Equal Suffrage Association. In 1884 a Kansas Equal Suffrage Association was formed and Wait served as vice-president at large. In 1911 Wait was elected president of the Sixth District of the Equal Suffrage Association. 

Wait died on May 9, 1916 in Lincoln County, Kansas.

Legacy
Wait was included in the 1893 publication A Woman of the Century.

See also
 List of suffragists and suffragettes

References

External links

1837 births  
1916 deaths
American suffragists
People from Medina County, Ohio
Schoolteachers from Ohio
People from Lincoln County, Kansas
American women educators